XRT may refer to:

X-ray telescope
Radiotherapy used in cancer treatment
WXRT-FM, a Chicago radio station branded as 93-XRT
XRayTracer, a python software library for ray tracing and wave propagation in x-ray regime.